The November 2010 San Francisco general elections was held on November 2, 2010, in San Francisco, California. The elections included five seats to the San Francisco Board of Supervisors, a runoff election for a seat on the San Francisco County Superior Court, assessor-recorder, public defender, and fifteen San Francisco ballot measures.

Board of Supervisors

Superior Court

Seat 15

As no candidate had more than 50% of the votes in the June 2010 election, a runoff election was held between the two highest vote-getting candidates.

Assessor-Recorder
Incumbent assessor-recorder Phil Ting ran for reelection against James Pan.

Public defender
Incumbent public defender Jeff Adachi ran for reelection unopposed.

Propositions

Note: "City" refers to the San Francisco municipal government.

Proposition AA 

Proposition AA would increase the annual vehicle registration fee by $10 to fund congestion and pollution mitigation programs.

Proposition A 

Proposition A would authorize the City to issue $46.15 million in bonds for the seismic retrofitting of multi-story wood structures. This measure required a two-thirds majority to pass.

Proposition B 

Proposition B would require city employees to contribute additional amounts to their pensions and health benefits, and changed arbitration rules regarding City collective bargaining agreements.

Proposition C 

Proposition C would require the Mayor to appear before the Board of Supervisors monthly for formal policy discussions.

Proposition D 

Proposition D would allow adult noncitizen parents, guardians, and caregivers with children in the San Francisco Unified School District to vote in San Francisco Board of Education elections.

Proposition E 

Proposition E would allow for Election Day voter registration for municipal elections.

Proposition F 

Proposition F would shorten, for one time only, the term of one Health Service Board member from five to three years and of another from five to two years, so that terms will expire in pairs and can be filled in the same Board election.

Proposition G 

Proposition G would remove the wage formula impacting San Francisco Municipal Railway operators from the City Charter in favor of collective bargaining and binding arbitration, and modify rules regarding binding arbitration and terms of employment for San Francisco Municipal Transportation Agency employees.

Proposition H 

Proposition H would prohibit local elected officials from holding a position on a political party county central committee.

Proposition I 

Proposition I would allow early voting on the Saturday before the 2011 municipal elections, paid for by individual and group donors, followed by a study of the efficacy of Saturday elections in the future.

Proposition J 

Proposition J would impose a temporary 2% increase on the hotel room tax, clarified who is responsible for collecting and remitting third-party taxes, consolidated definitions, and amended the definition of "Permanent Resident."

Proposition K 

Proposition K would clarify who is responsible for collecting and remitting third-party taxes, consolidate definitions, and amend the definition of "Permanent Resident." It would override the tax increase portion of Proposition J if both propositions passed and Proposition K received more votes.

Proposition L 

Proposition L would prohibit sitting or lying on sidewalks between 7 am and 11 pm with certain exceptions.

Proposition M 

Proposition M would establish community policing and foot patrols. It would override Proposition L if both propositions had passed and Proposition M received more votes.

Proposition N 

Proposition N would increase the real property transfer tax on certain properties.

External links
San Francisco Department of Elections

San Francisco 11
2010 11
Elections 11
San Francisco 11
2010s in San Francisco